Arduino Colasanti (24 June 1877 – 23 November 1935) was an Italian Renaissance scholar who served as general director of the Department of Antiquity and Fine Arts in Rome.

Biography
Born in Rome, Colasanti was the official representative of the Italian ministry of public instruction at the San Francisco Exposition in 1915. After spending four months there, he stated:

Colasanti became General Director of Antiquity and Fine Arts in Rome. On January 12, 1920, Colasanti disseminated a tract titled 'Circular No. 13: Collection of Decorative Elements of Italian Peasant Art', of which it was written: "A Renaissance scholar turned bureaucrat, Colasanti urged superintendents, directors, gallery inspectors, artists and students of art to begin collecting peasant art before it was forever lost or destroyed, owing to what he perceived to be the threat of incipient industrialization and urbanization". Under Colasanti's leadership, Luigi Parpagliolo drafted legislation for the preservation of both natural and architectural locations, which was enacted in 1922. The legislation "stressed the intimate relationship between vernacular architecture and landscape that testified to the anthropological history of place".

In the early 1920s, Colasanti evaluated the Isleworth Mona Lisa, with his thoughts being recorded as follows:

In the mid-1920s, Colasanti, in his capacity as director of the Italian Fine Arts institute, led excavations on the Island of Capri of sites thought to have been used for  orgies of emperor Tiberius. Colasanti expressed his belief "that relics of classic arts he expects to find, will depict scenes in the life of the emperor". A 1933 evaluation of the impact of cultural relations between Argentina and Italy stated, "[i]n philosophy, fine arts, and antiquities, the lectures and debates given by men like Giovanni Calo and Arduino Colasanti, formerly director of the fine arts section of the Ministry of Education, were among the most important recently organized".

Colasanti died in Rome at the age of 58.

Works
 Le stagioni nell'antichità e nell'arte cristiana, Roma, Società Editrice Dante Alighieri, 1901.
 Gubbio, Bergamo, Istituto italiano d'arti grafiche, 1905.
 L' Aniene, Bergamo, Istituto italiano d'arti grafiche, 1906.
 Loreto, Bergamo, Istituto italiano d'arti grafiche, 1910.
 Lorenzo e Jacopo Salimbeni da Sanseverino, Roma, Calzone, 1910.
 L'arte bisantina in Italia, prefazione di Corrado Ricci, Milano, Bestetti e Tumminelli, 1912.
 Case e palazzi barocchi di Roma, Milano, Bestetti & Tumminelli, 1913-1924.
 Le fontane d'Italia, Milano-Roma, Bestetti e Tumminelli, 1926.
 Medioevo artistico italiano, coperta e fregi del pittore Guido Marussig, Milano, Treves, 1927. 
 Donatello, Roma, Casa Editrice d'Arte Valori Plastici, [dopo il 1929].
 La pittura del Quattrocento nelle Marche, Milano, Pantheon Edizioni d'arte, 1932.

References

1877 births
1935 deaths
Writers from Rome
Italian art historians